Sigmoria is a genus of flat-backed millipedes in the family Xystodesmidae. There are more than 40 described species in Sigmoria.

Species
These 45 species belong to the genus Sigmoria:

 Sigmoria aberrans Chamberlin (almond millipede)
 Sigmoria acuminata (Hoffman, 1956)
 Sigmoria ainsliei (Chamberlin, 1921)
 Sigmoria areolata Shelley, 1981
 Sigmoria aspila Chamberlin
 Sigmoria australis Shelley, 1986
 Sigmoria austrimontis Shelley, 1981
 Sigmoria bidens (Causey, 1942)
 Sigmoria brachygon Chamberlin, 1940
 Sigmoria brooksi Hoffman, 1956
 Sigmoria conclusa Chamberlin, 1939
 Sigmoria dactylifera Hoffman, 1956
 Sigmoria disjuncta Shelley, 1981
 Sigmoria furcifera Hoffman, 1949
 Sigmoria inornata Shelley, 1981
 Sigmoria kleinpeteri (Hoffman, 1949)
 Sigmoria laticurvosa Shelley, 1981
 Sigmoria latior (Brölemann, 1900)
 Sigmoria macra (Chamberlin, 1939)
 Sigmoria mariona Chamberlin, 1939
 Sigmoria mimetica (Chamberlin, 1918)
 Sigmoria munda Chamberlin, 1939
 Sigmoria nantahalae Hoffman, 1958
 Sigmoria nigrescens Hoffman, 1950
 Sigmoria nigrimontis (Chamberlin, 1947)
 Sigmoria obscura Hoffman
 Sigmoria pendulosa Shelley, 1986
 Sigmoria planca
 Sigmoria plancus (Loomis, 1944)
 Sigmoria quadrata Shelley, 1981
 Sigmoria rigida Shelley, 1986
 Sigmoria rubromarginata (Bollman, 1888)
 Sigmoria sigirioides Shelley, 1981
 Sigmoria simplex Shelley, 1981
 Sigmoria stenogon Chamberlin, 1942
 Sigmoria stenoloba Shelley, 1981
 Sigmoria translineata Shelley, 1981
 Sigmoria triangulata Shelley, 1981
 Sigmoria trimaculata (Wood, 1864)
 Sigmoria truncata Shelley, 1981
 Sigmoria tuberosa Shelley, 1981
 Sigmoria watauga Shelley, 1986
 Sigmoria whiteheadi Shelley, 1986
 Sigmoria wrighti (Hoffman, 1956)
 Sigmoria zyga Chamberlin, 1949

References

Further reading

External links

 

Polydesmida
Articles created by Qbugbot